Fannrem concentration camp was a concentration camp that was located in the municipality of Orkdal in the old Sør-Trøndelag county, Norway. The current municipality is Orkland and the county is Trøndelag.  It was established as an annex to the Grini concentration camp by the Nazi authorities in Norway in October 1944 and lasted until the end of the war.  

The camp consisted of military barracks that held between 6 and 20 prisoners who were kept very isolated.  Up to 200 prisoners were in the camp at one time.  The prisoners were engaged in hard labor while at Fannrem.  Prisoners were put to work as slave labor on the Thamshavn Line railroad.

See also
List of Nazi-German concentration camps

References

Orkdal
Orkland
Nazi concentration camps in Norway
1944 establishments in Norway
Organizations established in 1944